Humphrey Park railway station is in the Trafford metropolitan borough of Greater Manchester in the north west of England. The station and all services calling there are operated by Northern Trains.

Facilities

The station has no station building, no ticket machines and is unstaffed. There are CCTV cameras operating here.  Each platform has waiting shelters, with seating available on only one side (towards Liverpool). A payphone was available on the Manchester-bound platform but lack of use and repeated vandalism saw it removed completely in early 2020. Step-free access is available to both platforms via ramps from the road below.  Train running information can be obtained from timetable posters and by phone.

Services

Services call every two hours hour in each direction, towards Urmston and Liverpool Lime Street to the west and towards Trafford Park and Manchester Oxford Road in the east in off-peaks. Services increase to half-hourly during peak times and may stop at extra stations along the route. In the late evening services are hourly. There is no Sunday service provided.

References

External links

Railway stations in Trafford
Category'DfT Category F2 stations
Railway stations opened by British Rail
Railway stations in Great Britain opened in 1984
Northern franchise railway stations